M/Y Va Bene is a luxury yacht designed by Richard Hein and built in 1992 by Kees Cornelissen. Since 2005, it has been owned by rock musician Eric Clapton. The yacht reportedly cost 9 million pounds.

History
In 1992, Va Bene was designed by Richard Hein and built by Kees Cornelissen for a Greek citizen in the Netherlands. In 1997, he sold the yacht to Bernie Ecclestone. Ecclestone started looking for a buyer in 2002. Clapton, who had been looking for a new yacht, contacted Ecclestone in 2005, and purchased the ship for £9 million. Clapton had the yacht refitted from 2007 to 2008.

Accouterment

Water sports

Intrepid Tender with 2× 250HP engines
2× Zodiac extra boats
2× Sea-Doo 1500cc Jetskis
2× Kayaks
2× Waterskis
2× Wakeboards
Snorkel equipment
Fishing equipment

Accommodation

1 Master suite
4 Duplex suites
1 Double bedroom
Whirlpool
VSAT, Satellite broadcasting
Wi-Fi

External links
Further information and images, pendennis.com

References

Motor yachts
Eric Clapton
1992 ships